The R930 road is a regional road in Ireland which links the N20 road with the R883 regional road in Mallow in County Cork.

See also 

 Roads in Ireland
 National primary road
 National secondary road

References 

Regional roads in the Republic of Ireland

Roads in County Cork